The 2013–14 2. Bundesliga was the 40th season of the 2. Bundesliga, Germany's second-level football league. The league was won by 1. FC Köln.

Teams

Promotions and relegations
Teams promoted from the 2. Bundesliga to the Bundesliga directly
Hertha BSC
Eintracht Braunschweig

Teams relegated from the 2012–13 Bundesliga directly
Fortuna Düsseldorf
SpVgg Greuther Fürth

Teams relegated to the 3. Liga directly
SV Sandhausen MSV Duisburg
Jahn Regensburg

Teams promoted from the 2012–13 3. Liga to the 2. Bundesliga directly
Karlsruher SC
Arminia Bielefeld

Playoff winners
 Third placed 2. Bundesliga side 1. FC Kaiserslautern were defeated by 16th placed Bundesliga side 1899 Hoffenheim in the course of the Bundesliga promotion-relegation play-offs and thus remain in the 2. Bundesliga.
16th placed 2. Bundesliga side Dynamo Dresden defeated third placed 3. Liga side VfL Osnabrück in the course of the 2. Bundesliga promotion-relegation play-offs and thus remain in the 2. Bundesliga.

On 29 May 2013, the German Football League (DFL) announced that MSV Duisburg would not get a license for the 2013–14 season as the club could not prove their financial capability. Duisburg were relegated and SV Sandhausen were reinstated in their place.

Stadiums and locations

Personnel and sponsorships

Managerial changes

League table

Results

Relegation play-offs
Arminia Bielefeld, who finished 16th, faced SV Darmstadt 98, the third-placed 2013–14 3. Liga side for a two-legged play-off. The winner on aggregate score after both matches earned a spot in the 2014–15 2. Bundesliga.

First leg

Second leg

5–5 on aggregate. Darmstadt won on away goals.

Season statistics

Top scorers
Updated 11 May 2014

Top assists
Updated 11 May 2014

Hat-tricks

References

2013-14
2
Ger